Peperomia crispa is a species of plant in the family Piperaceae. It is endemic to Ecuador and Colombia.

References

crispa
Flora of Ecuador
Flora of Colombia
Vulnerable plants
Taxonomy articles created by Polbot